Academy Hall is an academic building on the campus of Edinboro University of Pennsylvania in Edinboro, Pennsylvania. Originally known as Austin Hall for its architect, the hall has since been called a variety of names that reflected its use at the time, including Literary Hall, Commercial Hall and Music Hall. Built in 1857, Academy Hall is the oldest building at the university and the oldest normal school building in Pennsylvania. It was listed on the National Register of Historic Places in 2006.

Design 
Academy Hall is a two-story, Italianate-style structure located at the intersection of High and Normal Streets at Edinboro University of Pennsylvania, southeast of downtown Edinboro. A cupola with a low, pyramidal roof and arched windows is perched atop the building. Beneath the brackets and dentil on the cupola is a "Greek key fretwork". 
The exterior of Academy Hall has remained unaltered since its construction, other than a new basement and foundation when it was moved in 1880, and the removal of chimneys in 1885. During renovations in 2006 and 2007, parts of the first floor ceiling were removed and a mezzanine installed. The cupola also functions as a skylight.

History 
The contract for the building was awarded to Nathaniel C. Austin, a local architect and carpenter. Austin Hall was completed in 1857 and was dedicated on December 14, 1857, the day before classes began.

During the construction, the Pennsylvania General Assembly passed the Normal School Act of 1857. The trustees of Edinboro Academy immediately decided to pursue certification as a normal school under the act. An additional  were purchased and three more buildings erected: an assembly hall and two dormitories. The academy official became the Northwestern State Normal School on January 23, 1861. It was the second such school in Pennsylvania, the first being at Millersville.

It was renamed Literary Hall the same year when its second floor became used primarily by the school's literary societies. From 1912 to 1917, the hall was used by business courses and classes for "secretarial skills" and became called Commercial Hall. In 1917, the building was used by music students and became Music Hall. The State Normal School became a State Teachers College in 1927 and a State College in 1960. The college's Alumni Office took over Music Hall in 1965 and renamed it back to Academy Hall. In 1983, Pennsylvania created the State System of Higher Education with Edinboro State College becoming the Edinboro University of Pennsylvania.

Academy Hall was left vacant in 1996. It underwent a $2.4 million restoration that was completed when it was rededicated on January 18, 2007 as part of the 150th anniversary celebration of the founding of Edinboro University. The hall now houses the university's admissions office.

See also 

 List of the oldest buildings in Pennsylvania
 National Register of Historic Places listings at colleges and universities in the United States
 National Register of Historic Places listings in Erie County, Pennsylvania

References

Sources 

 
 

University and college buildings completed in 1857
Buildings and structures in Erie County, Pennsylvania
Edinboro University of Pennsylvania
Italianate architecture in Pennsylvania
Relocated buildings and structures in Pennsylvania
University and college academic buildings in the United States
University and college buildings on the National Register of Historic Places in Pennsylvania
National Register of Historic Places in Erie County, Pennsylvania
1857 establishments in Pennsylvania